The CU Independent is the student-run news publication for the University of Colorado Boulder. It has been digital-only since 2006, when it became one of the first major college newspapers to drop its print edition.

The website has a staff of about 60 students serving as editors, reporters, and photographers. Most are journalism majors, but students from other majors also contribute.

The students update the online edition with new content at least once a day during the fall and spring semesters. The website serves desktop and laptop computers as well as smartphones and other mobile devices.

There are about 20 section editors who assign stories to reporters and work with the visual staff to produce photographs, videos, and graphics. Two managing editors and the editor-in-chief oversee the website.

In 2016 and 2019, the CU Independent won an Online Pacemaker Award presented by the Associated Collegiate Press. It has also won several regional awards from the Society of Professional Journalists including Best Independent Online Student Publication in 2014, 2015, 2016, and 2018.

History

The CU Independent was founded in 1978 as the Working Press but soon adopted the name Campus Press. It was launched by Mal Deans, a CU journalism instructor, to serve as a student-run newspaper after the Colorado Daily left campus and became a community newspaper.

The Campus Press published a weekly printed edition in the fall and spring semesters as part of a journalism class. It began publishing online in April 1994, making it the first online newspaper in Colorado.

The Campus Press became an online-only publication in August 2006, years ahead of most college newspapers. The tagline on the website was changed from "CU's only independent student voice" to "CU's only student voice."

The publication's name was changed to the CU Independent in August 2008 as it split from the journalism school's curriculum in the wake of a controversy over a student journalist's racially charged column.

The CU Independent launched a new website on January 12, 2009, then again in September 2017 and again in August 2019.

In December 2019, the university's media college, which had been providing space and retaining staff pay, announced it would defund the CU Independent in favor of a faculty-led media enterprise. Staff of the CU Independent said they would continue to maintain the website and publish content under a new funding model separate from the college.

Awards
2014
 Best Digital-Only Student Publication (winner)
 Online News Reporting (winner): "Boulder Flood 2013 coverage" by CU Independent Staff
 Online Sports Reporting (winner): "Upset: Men's basketball wins Arizona rematch" by Jillian Arja, Will Collins, Kai Casey, and James Bradbury
 Online Opinion & Commentary (winner): Lizzy Hernandez with CU Independent

2015
 2015 Online Pacemaker Award (finalist)
 Best Digital-Only Student Publication (winner)
 Online Feature Reporting (finalist): People of 4/20 by Patrick Fort Kai Casey, and Rob Denton
 Online In-Depth Reporting (finalist): Economic upturn might not be enough for Colorado Democrats in congressional midterms by Lars Gesing
 Online In-Depth Reporting (finalist): The party of non-voters: Meet Colorado's no-shows by Lars Gesing
 Online News Reporting (winner): Senator Udall visits CU on campaign trail by Lars Gesing, Gray Bender, and Nigel Amstock
 Online Opinion & Commentary (winner): Opinion: The view on Ferguson, Mike Brown and the America by Ellis Arnold

2016
 2016 Online Pacemaker Award
 Best Digital-Only Student Publication (winner)
 Best Use of Multimedia (finalist): Your money, your vote: all you need to know by CU Independent Staff
 Online Feature Reporting (finalist): Standing OUt: Being an African-American athlete at CU by Ellis Arnold
 Online News Reporting (finalist): Immigration rally puts forth message of acceptance and action by Sarah Farley, Alexis Clark, and Danny Anderson
 Online News Reporting (finalist): Missing CU student had 'spiritual awakening,' personal life changes before disappearance by Ellis Arnold
 Online Opinion & Commentary (winner): Kaley LaQuea opinion writing
 Online Opinion & Commentary (finalist): McPeak's Politics by Emily McPeak

2017
 Best Independent Online Student Publication (finalist).
 Online Feature Reporting (winner): The heartbreak drug: Xanax at CU Boulder by Jackson Barnett
 Online Opinion & Commentary (winner): Black Girl in a Blizzard columns by Lauren Arnold
 Best Use of Multimedia (finalist): Hundreds gather at DIA to protest Trump executive action banning refugees, Muslims by Jackson Barnett
 Best Use of Multimedia (finalist): With DACA rescinded, Boulder rallies to support immigrants by Carina Julig, Jake Mauff, Lucy Haggard and Heidi Harris

2018
 Best Independent Online Student Publication (winner)
 Online In-Depth Reporting (finalist): The trump effect: Immigration at CU by Jackson Barnett, Heidi Harris, Devi Chung
 Online In-Depth Reporting (finalist): Use of Adderall, Vyvanse, Ritalin as ‘study drugs’ pervasive on campus by Hannah Metzger
 Online Sports Reporting (winner): Happy 500th, Folsom Field: A look back at the history of a great venue by Scott MacDonald
 Online Opinion & Commentary (winner): Red, right and blue by Henry Bowditch

2019
 Online News Reporting (winner): Students hold rally in protest of Mark Kennedy’s presidential nomination by Carina Julig, Robert Tann, Tory Lysik and Lucy Haggard
 Online News Reporting (finalist): Micromobility in Boulder: What is it? by Anna Haynes
 Online News Reporting (finalist): Inside the wild frat formal that contributed to the split between SigEp and IFC by Tory Lysik
 Online Feature Reporting (winner): Behind the scenes of affluent Boulder is the city’s working class by Hannah Metzger
 Online Feature Reporting (finalist): Free speech, hate speech and an executive order by Robert Tann, Anna Haynes and Fiona Matson
 Online In-Depth Reporting (winner): Yellow Deli restaurant linked to organization accused of child abuse, CUI investigation finds by Colie Dorfman
 Online Opinion & Commentary (finalist): CU Bluffs: Students want to rename ‘sidewalk’ something more politically correct by Alex Mumm
 Online Opinion & Commentary (finalist): Thinking green doesn’t have to make us feel blue by Savannah Mather

Popular culture
A photograph taken by CU Independent staff member, and University of Colorado - Boulder student, Andy Duann, showing a falling bear, was upvoted 7,700 times and generated at least 400 comments on Reddit. It inspired the Tumblr pages Bearflop and Falling Bear. The image was also picked up by major internet news sites including The Guardian, The Washington Post, and International Business Times, as well as Huffington Post, Boing Boing, and Mashable.

References

University of Colorado Boulder
Student newspapers published in Colorado